The Symmetry454 calendar (Sym454) is a proposal for calendar reform created by Irv Bromberg of the University of Toronto, Canada. It is a perennial solar calendar that conserves the traditional month pattern and 7-day week, has symmetrical equal quarters in 82% of the years in its 293-year cycle, and starts every month on Monday.

Calendar year 

The proposed calendar is laid out as follows:

 The last 7 days of December, shown in grey, are intercalary days that are appended only to the end of leap years.

The idea of months having 4 or 5 whole weeks is not new, having been proposed in the 1970s by Chris Carrier for the Bonavian Civil Calendar and by Joseph Shteinberg for his "Calendar Without Split Weeks". Whereas the former has 5 + 4 + 4 weeks per quarter, and the latter has 4 + 4 + 5 weeks per quarter, the Symmetry454 Calendar has a symmetrical 4 + 5 + 4 weeks per quarter, which is why it is named Symmetry454. 
Balanced quarters are desirable for businesses because they aid in fiscal planning and analysis.

All months have a whole number of weeks, so no month ever has a partial week.  Each day number within a month falls on the same weekday in all months and years; in particular, Friday the 13th never occurs under this calendar.

All holidays, birthdays, anniversaries, etc. are permanently fixed.
All ordinal day and week numbers within the year are also permanently fixed.

Leap rule

Unlike the World Calendar or the International Fixed Calendar (also known as the 13-Month Calendar), there are no individually scheduled intercalary "null" days outside of the traditional 7-day week.  Instead, alignment of the weekday cycle with New Year Day is accomplished by using a leap week, which is appended once every 5 or 6 years. In leap years, December becomes a 5-week month. The leap week is shown in grey text in the above calendar year.

The preferred Symmetry454 leap rule is based upon a symmetrical 293-year leap cycle having 52 leap years at intervals that are as uniformly spread as possible:

This expression inherently causes leap year intervals to fall into sub-cycle patterns of (5+6+6) = 17 or (5+6) = 11 years, which symmetrically group to 17+11+17 = 45 or to 17+17+11+17+17 = 79 years. The full symmetrical grouping for each cycle is: 45+79+45+79+45 = 293 years. Outside of calendar theory, this arrangement is known as maximal evenness.

The 52/293 leap cycle has a calendar mean year of 365+71/293 days, or 365 days 5 hours 48 minutes and about 56.5 seconds, which is intentionally slightly shorter than the present era mean northward equinoctial year of 365 days 5 hours 49 minutes and 0 seconds (mean solar time).

Calendar arithmetic

The Kalendis calendar calculator demonstrates the Symmetry454 calendar and interconverts dates between Symmetry454 and a variety of other calendars.

The Symmetry454 arithmetic is fully documented and placed in the public domain for royalty-free computer implementation.

Officially, Symmetry454 has been running since January 1, 2005, which was the first New Year Day after it came into existence.  Its proleptic epoch, however, was on the same day as the proleptic epoch of the Gregorian Calendar = January 1, 1 AD.

Easter on a fixed date

Tentatively, Sunday April 7 on the Symmetry454 Calendar is proposed as a fixed date for Easter, based on a frequency analysis of the distribution of the Gregorian or Astronomical Easter dates. 

There are only five possible dates for Easter within the Symmetry454 Calendar, since only day numbers divisible by 7 can be a Sunday. The three highest-frequency dates upon which Easter can land are March 28, April 7, and April 14. Selecting the middle date (April 7) would fix Easter at its median position within its distribution range.

See also 
 4–4–5 calendar: Similar month structure.

References
 "Designs for a new year", in the "Innovators" section of the Toronto Star newspaper, Friday, December 24, 2004, page A3, by reporter Peter Gorrie.
 "Star Trek Math Inspires Calendar Reform", Discovery Channel, Thursday, December 30, 2004, by Jennifer Viegas, Discovery News.
 "Time and Again, the Calendar Comes Up Short:  Sticklers for Symmetry Lament Imperfections in the 400-Year-Old Gregorian System; Earth's Inconvenient Orbit", The Wall Street Journal, December 31, 2009, by Charles Forelle, The Numbers Guy.
 "New Year’s Revolution: A proposed new calendar would give February an extra week and start every month on a Monday", University of Toronto Magazine, in Leading Edge, Winter 2011, by Scott Anderson.

External links
The Symmetry454 Calendar (full specifications, FAQs, arithmetic)
The Kalendis Calendar Calculator (freeware)
The Lengths of the Seasons (numerical integration analysis)
Solar Calendar Leap Rule Studies (shows why the 52/293 leap rule is preferred)

Proposed calendars
Leap week calendars
Specific calendars
2005 introductions